Douglas Ryder (born 26 November 1971) is a South African former cyclist, who works as the general manager UCI ProTeam . He previously worked for UCI WorldTeam  before the team disbanded in 2021. He competed in the men's individual road race at the 1996 Summer Olympics.

Major results
1995
 5th Overall Tour de Langkawi
2001
 2nd  Road race, African Road Championships

References

External links

1971 births
Living people
South African male cyclists
Olympic cyclists of South Africa
Cyclists at the 1996 Summer Olympics
Sportspeople from Cape Town
White South African people
African Games competitors for South Africa
20th-century South African people
21st-century South African people